The 2022 League1 Canada season was the first edition of League1 Canada, the third division of men's and women's soccer in Canada. The 2022 season included regional leagues and playoffs, as well as the inaugural Women's Interprovincial Championship. A men's interprovincial tournament will not debut until the 2023 season.

Men's competitions

Provincial leagues

Provincial playoffs
League1 BC Championship Final

League1 Ontario Playoffs

Provincial league cups
Coupe PLSQ

Women's competitions

Provincial leagues

Provincial playoffs
League1 BC Championship Final

League1 Ontario Playoffs

Provincial league cups
Coupe PLSQ

Interprovincial Championship

Details

Bracket

Matches
Semi-finals

Third place match

Final

References

 
League1